Feast Portland is an annual food festival in Portland, Oregon, United States. According to Eater, Feast is the largest "celebration of food and drink" in the Pacific Northwest.

History
The event was established in 2012, co-founded by Carrie Welch and Mike Thelin.

The main event for 2019 (called "Big Feast") was held at Tom McCall Waterfront Park. The cast of the television series Stumptown attended. In May 2020, organizers announced the event planned for September would not be possible because of the COVID-19 pandemic. In 2022, organizers announced the event would not return.

References

External links

 
 

2012 establishments in Oregon
Annual events in Portland, Oregon
Food and drink festivals in the United States
Recurring events established in 2012